Barry Brooker (born 19 July 1941) is a Canadian gymnast. He competed in eight events at the 1968 Summer Olympics.

References

1941 births
Living people
Canadian male artistic gymnasts
Olympic gymnasts of Canada
Gymnasts at the 1968 Summer Olympics
Gymnasts from Toronto